Kim Da-som (born May 6, 1993), better known mononymously as Dasom, is a South Korean singer and actress. She is best known as a former member of South Korean girl group Sistar and formerly under Starship Entertainment. She has acted in films and television dramas, including Family (2012–2013), Melody of Love (2013–2014), The Virtual Bride (2015), Sister is Alive (2017) and He Is Psychometric (2019).

Career

Pre-debut 
Prior to debuting as a singer, Dasom had entered and won various poem and songwriting contests.

Sistar 

In June 2010, Dasom made her debut as a member of Sistar on KBS Music Bank with their debut single, "Push Push".

Acting career
In July 2012, Dasom made her acting debut in KBS' daily sitcom Family, playing as a high school punk.
Dasom also appeared in the music video for boy band VIXX's song "Rock Ur Body" which was released on August 13, 2012; and K.Will's music video for the song "Please Don't..." which was released on October 10, 2012.

In January 2013, Dasom co-hosted the Golden Disc Awards, held in Malaysia. In April, she featured in K.Will's music video for his single, "Love Blossom". The same year, Dasom starred as the female lead in the family drama, Melody of Love.

In June 2015, it was revealed that Dasom will join the MBC variety show My Little Television as a regular guest. In July, Dasom joined the cast of SBS variety show Law of the Jungle. 
Dasom then starred in the KBS drama The Eccentric Daughter-in-Law as the lead, which premiered in August 2015. In December, Dasom made her big screen debut in the film Like a French Film.

In January 2017, Dasom collaborated with 40 and released a remake of duo Acoustic Collabo's “You and I, Heart Fluttering”. The same year, Dasom starred in television series Band of Sisters, playing an antagonist role.

In 2018, Dasom was cast in the KBS Drama Special Ms. Kim's Mystery, as well as the tvN drama He Is Psychometric.

In June 2021, Dasom chose not to renew her contract with King Kong by Starship.

On August 2, Content Lab VIVO announced that Dasom and Hyolyn have collaborated as the artist of the month for the "How To Spend 2021 Well" project. The project's goal is to help the public that has been through a terrible time as a result of the pandemic by donating the music profits to the socioeconomic classes.On August 6, Dasom signed with her new agency, Story J Company.

Discography

Collaborative singles

Soundtrack appearances

Filmography

Film

Television series

Web series

Television show

Awards and nominations

Notes

References

External links 

 Kim Dasom on Instagram
 
 

1993 births
Living people
People from Gwangju, Gyeonggi
Sistar members
K-pop singers
South Korean female idols
South Korean women pop singers
South Korean sopranos
South Korean film actresses
South Korean television actresses
21st-century South Korean singers
Konkuk University alumni
21st-century South Korean women singers